Mosese Voka (born 7 June 1985) is a Fijian rugby player for Fijian Latui in Global Rapid Rugby and the Fijian national team.  His primary position is back row.

In August 2019 he was named in Fiji's squad for the 2019 Rugby World Cup.

References

External links 
 

1985 births
Living people
Fijian rugby union players
Rugby union flankers
Fiji international rugby union players
People from Yasawa
Fijian Drua players